Padmasree Warrior (born Yellepeddi Padmasree) is an Indian-American businesswoman and technology executive. She is known for her leadership roles in technology firms like Cisco where she served as the CTO for seven years, and at Motorola where she was the CTO for five years. She also served as the CEO of Nio USA, an electric car maker. Currently, she is the founder and CEO of Fable, a curated reading platform focused on mental wellness. She also serves on the board of directors of Microsoft and Spotify.

In 2014, she was listed as one of the 100 most powerful woman in the world by Forbes. In 2018 she was also featured among "America's Top 50 Women In Tech" by Forbes.

Early life 
Yellepeddi Padmasree was born into a Telugu family in Vijayawada of Andhra Pradesh, India. She went to school at the Children's Montessori School and Maris Stella College in Vijayawada. Warrior received a bachelor's degree in chemical engineering from IIT Delhi in 1982. She holds a master's degree in chemical engineering from Cornell University.

Career

Motorola 
Warrior joined Motorola in 1984 Over the course of her 23 years at the company she served as Corporate Vice-President and general manager of Motorola's Energy Systems Group, and Corporate Vice-President and Chief Technology Officer in its Semiconductor Products Sector. Immediately prior to becoming Motorola's CTO, she served as general manager of Thoughtbeam, a product of Motorola, in Tempe, Arizona. When named Motorola's CTO in January 2003, Warrior became a senior vice-president and in 2005 she was promoted to executive vice-president.

During Warrior's tenure as CTO, Motorola was awarded the 2004 National Medal of Technology by the President of the United States, the first time the company had received this honour. During this period she was a proponent of "Seamless Mobility" – the concept of having seamless communication across all facets of a person's life. The dream was not fully realised and the concept was eventually dropped from Motorola marketing presentations.

Cisco 
On 4 December 2007, she left Motorola to become CTO at Cisco Systems. She left Cisco in June 2015.

NIO 
She joined the Chinese electric car company, NIO Inc, in December 2015 as a board member and as CEO and chief development officer for NIO U.S. She resigned from NIO in December 2018.

Fable 
In September 2019, Warrior founded a new startup, Fable, where she serves as its president and CEO. In January 2021, Fable launched its app, a subscription-based book recommendation engine and private social network. Warrior has said they're working to improve cognitive fitness.

Recognition 
Fortune Magazine called her one of four rising stars on its Most Powerful Women list, placing her between the 10 "highest paid" and the "Young and Powerful" categories. In 2005, The Economic Times ranked Warrior as the 11th Most Influential Global Indian. In 2001 she was one of six women nationwide selected to receive the "Women Elevating Science and Technology" award from Working Woman Magazine. As of 2014, she is listed as the 71st most powerful woman in the world by Forbes. In 2018 she was also featured among "America's Top 50 Women In Tech" by Forbes.

Warrior is featured in the Notable Women in Computing cards.

Board participation 
Warrior has been a member of Microsoft's board of directors since December 2015. She is also a board member at Spotify. She was a member of the Gap Inc. board from 2013 to 2016 and the Box board from 2014 to 2016.

Warrior also serves on the boards of Thorn, the Joffrey Ballet, Chicago's Museum of Science and Industry, Chicago Mayor's Technology Council, and advisory council of Indian Institute of Technology. She previously served on the Cornell University board, the Texas Governor's Council for Digital Economy, the Technology Advisory Council for the FCC, and the Advisory Committee for Computing and Information Science and Engineering of the National Science Foundation (NSF). She is serving as a mentor in the State Department's International Women Leaders Mentoring Partnership. Warrior served on the board of directors for Corning Incorporated from 2005 through 2008.

Personal life 
Warrior is married to Mohandas Warrior and has a son.

References

External links 

 
 Profile

20th-century American women
20th-century Indian businesswomen
20th-century Indian businesspeople
20th-century Indian chemists
20th-century Indian engineers
20th-century Indian women scientists
20th-century women engineers
21st-century American women
21st-century Indian businesswomen
21st-century Indian businesspeople
21st-century Indian engineers
21st-century Indian women scientists
21st-century women engineers
American business executives
American people of Indian descent
American chief technology officers
American Hindus
American people of Telugu descent
American women engineers
Businesspeople from Vijayawada
Businesswomen from Andhra Pradesh
Cornell University College of Engineering alumni
Engineers from Andhra Pradesh
Indian chemical engineers
Indian emigrants to the United States
IIT Delhi alumni
Indian women chemists
Indian women engineers
Living people
Motorola employees
Scientists from Vijayawada
Women chief technology officers
Women scientists from Andhra Pradesh
Year of birth missing (living people)